The 2016 Inter-Provincial Championship is the fourth season of the Inter-Provincial Championship, the domestic three-day (though not officially first-class) cricket competition of Ireland. The competition is played between Leinster Lightning, Northern Knights and North West Warriors. The championship will be sponsored by Hanley Energy and will be observed International Cricket Council. The championship is in Strategic Plan of Cricket Ireland success to achieve Test Status for the national team.

Standings
The tournament was dominated by drawn matches; five of the six matches ended in a draw, with only Leinster Lightning managing a positive result from their game with North West Warriors. Highest score of the championship was 206 from Adam Dennison.

Squads

Fixtures

1st match

2nd match

3rd match

4th match

5th match

6th match

Highest Scores
 206 - A Dennison - Northern Cricket Union v North West, The Green, Comber 
 135* - J Anderson - Leinster Cricket Union v Northern Cricket Union Civil Service Cricket Club, Stormont, Belfast  
 121 -  O Williams - North West v Leinster Cricket Union The Village, Malahide, Dublin 
 101 -  GH Dockrell - Leinster Cricket Union v North West The Village, Malahide, Dublin

Best Bowling
 6-37 D Scanlon - North West v Northern Cricket Union Magheramason, Bready 
 6-92 J Mulder - Northern Cricket Union v North West Magheramason, Bready 
 5-24 GJ McCarter - Northern Cricket Union v Leinster Cricket Union Castle Avenue, Dublin

See also
2016 Inter-Provincial Cup
2016 Inter-Provincial Trophy

References

External links 
 Fixtures at Cricinfo

Inter
Inter-Provincial Championship seasons